The University of Wisconsin Armory and Gymnasium, also called "the Red Gym", is a building on the campus of University of Wisconsin–Madison. It was originally used as a combination gymnasium and armory beginning in 1894. Designed in the Romanesque revival style, it resembles a red brick castle. It is situated on the shores of Lake Mendota, overlooking Library Mall, and adjacent to Memorial Union.

History
Around the time of the construction of the building, labor riots had occurred in a number of cities in the United States, including the Haymarket riot in Chicago in 1886. Leaders in many cities saw the need for local armories to be prepared for worker strikes and uprisings. Thus, when funding the building, the Wisconsin legislature clearly saw its use by local militia. The architects, Conover and Porter, designed it with a dual purpose in mind: armory and gymnasium. Modifications were made to the plans when a new university president, Charles Adams, insisted that the second floor be capable of accommodating large assemblies. Construction began in fall, 1892, and was completed in September, 1894.

As originally constructed, the first floor of the Red Gym held military offices, an artillery drill room, bowling alleys, a locker room, and a swimming tank. The second floor contained a drill hall wide enough to permit a four-column battalion. The third floor was occupied by the gymnasium, which contained a baseball cage, gymnastic apparatus, and rowing machines. Two rifle ranges and a running track were on a level a few steps lower than the gym.

Over the next 30 years, the second floor assembly hall was the scene of speeches by William McKinley (1894), William Jennings Bryan (1912), Eugene Debs (1923), Upton Sinclair (who in 1922 had to promise not to be controversial), and the Republican state conventions of 1902 and 1904, which nominated Robert M. La Follette for governor.

The anti-military sentiment in Wisconsin that occurred after World War I resulted in the elimination of compulsory military training. The Red Gym was also no longer used for Big Ten basketball games following the construction of the university field house in 1930. In the 1930s and 1940s, much of the first and second floors was partitioned into offices. With diminishing use of the building after World War II, plans were made to demolish it; however, popular sentiment delayed those plans. When a new gym was constructed on the west end of campus in 1963, the building was again slated for demolition, and again received a reprieve. In the 1960s, it once again saw military use as ROTC headquarters. A firebomb aimed at the building by anti-war protesters in 1970 resulted in severe damage, which was repaired. Since then, the building has seen various administrative uses; it currently houses student services-related offices and centers.

The University of Wisconsin Armory and Gymnasium was declared a National Historic Landmark in 1993.

Gallery

See also
List of National Historic Landmarks in Wisconsin
National Register of Historic Places listings in Madison, Wisconsin

References

External links

 The University of Wisconsin–Madison Armory and Gymnasium, Wisconsin Historical Society
 Gymnasium and Armory in The Buildings of the University of Wisconsin

Government buildings completed in 1894
Infrastructure completed in 1894
Buildings and structures in Madison, Wisconsin
Military facilities on the National Register of Historic Places in Wisconsin
National Historic Landmarks in Wisconsin
University and college buildings on the National Register of Historic Places in Wisconsin
Armory and Gymnasium
Wisconsin Badgers basketball venues
Armories on the National Register of Historic Places
National Register of Historic Places in Madison, Wisconsin
Historic district contributing properties in Wisconsin
Sports venues on the National Register of Historic Places in Wisconsin
1894 establishments in Wisconsin